Varanger may refer to:
Varanger Peninsula of Norway
Cryogenian (also called Varanger glaciation)